The Mr. Football Award has been given out annually since 1987 to the player voted by the Associated Press to be the best high school football player in the state of Ohio.

Two players have won the award twice, Erick Howard and Robert Smith.  Three schools have had two different award winners, Kenton High School, Euclid High School, and Mentor High School, (Euclid High School has three total awards), and Kenton High School has the only brother pair to win, Maty and Ben Mauk.

Award winners by year

Schools with multiple winners

Colleges with multiple winners

References

Mr. Football awards
High school football in Ohio
1987 establishments in Ohio